Posey Township is one of twelve townships in Rush County, Indiana. As of the 2010 census, its population was 1,083 and it contained 455 housing units.

History
The Offutt Covered Bridge was listed on the National Register of Historic Places in 1983.

Geography

Unincorporated towns
 Arlington at 
(This list is based on USGS data and may include former settlements.)

References

External links
 Indiana Township Association
 United Township Association of Indiana

Townships in Rush County, Indiana
Townships in Indiana